Caryocar costaricense is a species of plant in the Caryocaraceae family. It is found in Colombia, Costa Rica, Panama, and Venezuela. It is threatened by habitat loss.

References

costaricense
Vulnerable plants
Taxonomy articles created by Polbot